Eslamabad-e Sofla may refer to:

Eslamabad Gamasyab Sofla, a village in Delfan County, Lorestan Province, Iran
Eslamabad-e Sofla, Ardabil
Eslamabad-e Sofla, Golestan
Eslamabad-e Sofla, Ilam
Eslamabad-e Sofla, Kermanshah
Eslamabad-e Sofla, Khuzestan
Eslamabad-e Sofla, Lorestan